Mariya Kartalova (born 26 June 1969) is a Bulgarian former artistic gymnast. She competed at the 1988 Summer Olympics.

References

1969 births
Living people
Bulgarian female artistic gymnasts
Gymnasts at the 1988 Summer Olympics
Olympic gymnasts of Bulgaria
Sportspeople from Plovdiv
Place of birth missing (living people)